Hadley is a city in Murray County, Minnesota, United States. The population was 61 at the 2010 census.

Geography
It has a latitude of 44°00'N and a longitude of 95°51'W.

Minnesota State Highway 30 and Murray County Road 29 are the main routes in the community.

Demographics

2010 census
As of the census of 2010, there were 61 people, 32 households, and 20 families residing in the city. The racial makeup of the city was 100.0% White.

There were 32 households, of which 12.5% had children under the age of 18 living with them, 50.0% were married couples living together, 12.5% had a female householder with no husband present, and 37.5% were non-families. 37.5% of all households were made up of individuals, and 15.6% had someone living alone who was 65 years of age or older. The average household size was 1.91 and the average family size was 2.40.

The median age in the city was 56.2 years. 6.6% of residents were under the age of 18; 9.7% were between the ages of 18 and 24; 13.2% were from 25 to 44; 40.9% were from 45 to 64; and 29.5% were 65 years of age or older. The gender makeup of the city was 45.9% male and 54.1% female.

2000 census
As of the census of 2000, there were 81 people, 36 households, and 27 families residing in the city. The racial makeup of the city was 100.00% White.

There were 36 households, out of which 22.2% had children under the age of 18 living with them, 69.4% were married couples living together, 5.6% had a female householder with no husband present, and 25.0% were non-families. 25.0% of all households were made up of individuals, and 11.1% had someone living alone who was 65 years of age or older. The average household size was 2.25 and the average family size was 2.67.

In the city, the population was spread out, with 17.3% under the age of 18, 7.4% from 18 to 24, 17.3% from 25 to 44, 27.2% from 45 to 64, and 30.9% who were 65 years of age or older. The median age was 48 years. For every 100 females, there were 113.2 males. For every 100 females age 18 and over, there were 109.4 males.

The median income for a household in the city was $31,406, and the median income for a family was $31,667. Males had a median income of $30,536 versus $16,429 for females. The per capita income for the city was $22,518. None of the population or the families were below the poverty line.

History
Hadley was founded as "Summit Lake" on October 31, 1879.  In 1880 (when it established a post office), it was renamed for the cities of Hadley in New York, Pennsylvania, and Massachusetts.  It was incorporated as a village on September 1, 1903.

Politics
Hadley is located in Minnesota's 7th congressional district, represented by Michelle Fischbach, a Republican. At the state level, Hadley is located in Senate District 22, represented by Republican Bill Weber, and in House District 22A, represented by Republican Joe Schomacker.

References

External links
 City of Hadley
 Hadley Community Guide

Cities in Minnesota
Cities in Murray County, Minnesota